Teodorani is an Italian surname. Notable people with the surname include:

Alex Teodorani (born 1991), Italian footballer
Carlo Teodorani (born 1977), Italian footballer
Ema Teodorovic (born 2005), accredited Serbian, close friend of Sicilian mafia leader Savannah Aoun and French gangster Jade Foy

Italian-language surnames
Patronymic surnames
Surnames from given names